Ajodhya Hills, is a small plateau with hilly surroundings located in the Purulia district of the state West Bengal, India. It is the easternmost part of the Chhotanagpur Plateau and extended part of Eastern Ghats range. Highest peak of Ajodhya Hills is Chamtaburu (699 m). The nearby populated town area is Bagmundi.

Geography

Overview

It is a popular place for young mountaineers to learn the basic course in rock climbing. There are three routes available to reach Ajodhya Hills. Via Jhalda, via Sirkabad and via Baghmundi. There are two Forest Rest Houses here, one at Ajodhya hill top and the other is at Matha range office. Other accommodation facilities are also available in Ajodhya Hill top and Bagmundi. There are Eco-resorts, 1. Gorgaburu Eco-resort, 2. Palash Bitan Jungle Hut at Murguma and 3. Eco-Adventure Resort at Khairabera. Gorgaburu (677 m), Mayuri etc. are some of the peaks of Ajodhya hills range. Chamtaburu (712 m) is also the highest peak of southern West Bengal.

The area forms the lowest step of the Chota Nagpur Plateau. The general scenario is undulating land with scattered hills. The area around Baghmundi or Ajodhya Hill is an extended plateau.

History

According to Hindu mythology, Rama and Sita had come to Ajodhya Hills and stayed during their exile. Sita was thirsty and Ram pierced an arrow through the Earth's soil crust and through that water gushed out. Sita quenched her thirst. The place is known as Sita-kunda. During the full moon day in Baisakh every year Santhal, Bhumij and Munda tribals of nearby areas come and join in the game of hunting wild animals, called Disum Sendra.

Distance from Kolkata
1. Balarampur (268m above Mean Sea Level): 319.7 Km

2. Matha (260m above MSL): 335.8 Km

3. Sirkabad (302m above MSL): 317.5 Km

4. Ajodhya Hill Top (575m above MSL): 289.9 Km (Via Sirkabad)

5. Jhalda (304mabove MSL): 306.1 Km

Places to Visit based on Balarampur-Bagmundi Route
1. Ajodhya Hill Top: About 5 Hotels, Resorts and Lodges. 42 Km from Balarampur Rly. Station via Matha. 24 Km from Matha Forest Range Office. 18 Km from Bagmundi.

2. Matha Forest Rest House: 18 Km from Balarampur Rly. Station. 10 Km from Bagmundi.

3. Bagmundi: 28 Km from Balarampur Rly. Station.

4. Turga Dam and Turga Falls: 30 Km from Balarampur Rly. Station. 2 Km from Bagmundi.

5. Upper Dam and Lower Dam of Purulia Pumped Storage Hydel Power Project: 36 Km from Balarampur Rly. Station. 18 Km from Matha. 10 Km from Bagmundi.

6. Paprakocha Dam, Gorgaburu Eco-Resot: 13 Km from Balarampur Rly. Station. 12 Km from Matha. 23 Km from Bagmundi.

7. Gorgaburu Eco-Resot: 13 Km from Balarampur Rly. Station. 12 Km from Matha. 23 Km from Bagmundi.

8. Khayrabera Dam and Chamtaburu Hill: 32 Km from Balarampur Rly. Station. 14 Km from Bagmundi. 24 Km from Matha.
 
9. Machkanda Falls: 40 Km from Balarampur Rly. Station. 22 Km from Bagmundi. 32 Km from Matha. (All via Khayrabera)

10. Chamtaburu Hill: 32 Km from Balarampur Rly. Station. 14 Km from Bagmundi. 24 Km from Matha.

11. Bamni Falls: 40 Km from Balarampur Rly. Station. 22 Km from Matha. 14 Km from Bagmundi.

12. Durga Bera: 39 Km from Balarampur Rly. Station. 21 Km from Matha. 13 Km from Bagmundi.

Places to Visit from Ajodhya Hill Top (with distance)

1. Upper Dam (495m above MSL) and Lower Dam (300m above MSL) of Purulia Pumped Storage Hydel Power Project: 6 Km and 9Km on same route

2. Durga Bera (572m above MSL): 7 Km

3. Bamni Falls (434m above MSL): 10 Km

4. Turga Dam (284m above MSL) and Turga Falls: 18 Km

5. Khayrabera Dam and Chamtaburu Hill: 21 Km (via forest road), 30 Km (via Bagmundi)

6. Machkanda Falls: 18 Km

7. Murguma Dam: 20 Km

8. Matha: 23 Km

9. Baghmundi (264m above Mean Sea Level ): 16 Km

10. Charida: 21 km

11. Pine Forest: 3 Km

12. Mayur Pahar (605m above MSL): 2 Km

13. Balarampur Rly. Station: 39 Km

14. Sirkabad: 15 Km

Distance from Jhalda
1. Murguma (338m above MSL): 16 Km (Via Begunkodar)

2. Khairabera (304m above MSL): 32 Km (Via Bagmundi)

Development
Purulia Pumped Storage Project with an installed capacity of 900 MW (4 X 225 MW) has been set up in Ajodhya hills under Baghmundi police station with the loan assistance of Japan Bank for International Cooperation.

Near Ajodhya Hills, there is Turga Dam and the Lake, and the pleasant waterfall formed by the River Bamni. The site of the Turga Dam site is a perfect tourist spot, where the visitors can spend their day.

References

Gallery

External links

Ajodhya Photographs at TrekEarth

Hills of West Bengal
Tourist attractions in Purulia district